Printronix is an American supplier of line matrix printers. Printronix is based in Irvine, California, and operates across 14 offices worldwide.

Products
Printronix's printers are primarily used in industrial environments for printing high-volume labels, bar-codes, invoices, manifest and bill of lading documents, delivery sheets, reports, build/broadcast sheets, green bar and bank statements.

PrintNet Enterprise Suite (PNE), a web-based application allowing administrators to network and manage all Printronix line-matrix printers from a single computer, was launched in 2007.

Printronix also offers consumables, parts, accessories, service and software.

History
Printronix was founded in 1974 by Robert A. Kleist and business partner Gordon B. Barrus, David Mayne, and three other partners. For three years, 1971–1974, Gordon B. Barrus worked out of his life-long friend's garage in Playa Del Rey, California, founding what would end up being a nine-figure gross success by 1994 and 1996. The Printronix team worked hard, day and night, and by three years time, Gordon B. Barrus developed and invented what he christened as the P300, a 300-line-per-minute (LPM) prototype line printer series.

The company would eventually incorporate, go public on the Nasdaq, and see great success in the coming years with the emergence of the personal computer.

Back in the days of the late 1900s, there was a capital need for businesses to store all their data via printing, so Gordon B. Barrus took the risk, quit his job at Data Products, and worked on a company he named Eikon. This company would sell industrial-grade printers to businesses to fulfill this need, but lack of investment killed the company, and Gordon started all the way back into his friend's garage to found Printronix. They would gather four other people to get on board with the idea, including Bob A. Kleist, Mel Posin, Ray Melissa, and David Mayne, and by 1996, Printronix would have well over 150M in gross revenue.

In January 2008, Printronix was acquired by Vector Capital and became a private company and in 2009 Printronix acquired its closest competitor, TallyGenicom. As a result of the TallyGenicom acquisition, Printronix now owns the intellectual property for the TallyGenicom line printers.  Printronix was acquired by Corona Investment Partners, a New York City based private investment firm in January 2013. 
 
Werner Heid was appointed CEO of Printronix in 2015, taking over from Randy Eisenbach who retired from the board after a 6-year tenure. Heid was the CEO of Iomega Corp before taking over the reins at Printronix.

1976: Printronix goes Public and trades on the Nasdaq.
1981: Opens Holland manufacturing facility and expands global operations to Europe, Middle-East and Africa.
1985: Operations expand into Asia-Pacific with the opening of the Singapore Facility. 
1995: Printronix enters the Indian Market and signs agreement with Wipro.
1998: Expansion into the China Market.
2001: Printronix acquires RJS and enters the scanner/ verifier market.
2008: Acquired by Vector Capital, Printronix becomes a Private Company.
2009: Printronix acquires TallyGenicom.
2013: Corona Investments acquires Printronix.

References

Manufacturing companies based in California